Dionysos is a French rock band formed in 1993 in Valence, Drôme; they formed at their lycée. They perform songs in both French and English, and have released six studio albums. They are well known in France for their surrealism and eccentricity.

Their first album, Happening Songs, was self-produced and with entirely English lyrics. With their second album The sun is blue like eggs in Winter (also self-produced) Babet became a member. In 1999, they signed to a major label (the now defunct Trema) and released Haïku which brought the band in to the public eye, mainly thanks to the success of the single "Coccinelle".

The name of the band comes from the ancient Greek god Dionysus, which in French is Dionysos.

Influences
There are strong non-musical influences from Tim Burton and Roald Dahl. A lot of the songs are surreal and many feature nonsense lyrics (for example "Surfin Frog"). The albums Monsters in Love and La mécanique du cœur are set in a surreal world full of whimsical monsters and other fantastic characters which Mathias Malzieu has used as a setting for two original comic books. Joann Sfar illustrated the cover art for the comic books as well as the two albums. Sfar's eccentric and humorous brand of fantasy fiction as displayed in the Donjon comic books lends itself easily to the band's fantasy-humor albums.

The lead singer, Mathias Malzieu, is also working on other projects such as the career of Olivia Ruiz (his partner), and his other hobby : writing (published 4 books in 2002, 2005, 2007 and 2011). His second book is based on the same world as the album Monsters in Love, his third book on the same world as the album La mécanique du cœur.  In the same way, there will be connections between his fourth book, Métamorphose en bord du ciel, but not to the same extent as La mécanique du cœur.

Members 

 Mathias Malzieu – vocals, ukulele, folk guitar, theremin, harmonica, glockenspiel
Mathias is the main songwriter and frontman. He has also written three books – 38 mini westerns (Pimientos, 2003), Maintenant qu'il fait tout le temps nuit sur toi (Flammarion, 2005) et La mécanique du cœur (Flammarion, 2007) – with inspiration drawing between the albums and the novels.
 Éric Serra Tosio  Rico – drums, percussion, whistle
 Michaël Ponton a.k.a. Miky Biky – lead guitar, phonograph turntable, banjo, lapsteel, ukulele, programming
The Miky Biky co-produced La mécanique du cœur with Mathias.
 Guillaume Garidel a.k.a. Guillermo – bass guitar, contrabass, synthesizer
 Élisabeth Maistre a.k.a. Babet – vocals, violin, keys, banjo, theremin (member since 1998)
Babet has begun a solo career and released two albums: Drôle d'oiseau (5 March 2007) and Piano Monstre (27 September 2010).
 Stéphan Bertholio a.k.a. Stéphano – banjo, keys, bass, glockenspiel, ukulele, baritone guitar, lapsteel, musical saw, melodica (backliner, then official member since 2002)
Stéphan worked as the band's backliner on tour, but joined officially during the recording of Monsters in Love.

Discography

Studio albums
Happening Songs (self-produced, 1996)
The Sun Is Blue Like the Eggs in Winter (self-produced, 1998)
Haïku (Trema, 1999)
Western sous la neige (Trema, 2002)
Monsters in Love (Trema, 2005)
La Mécanique du Cœur (Barclay, 2007)
Bird 'n' Roll (Barclay, March 2012)
Vampire en pyjama (L'Extraordinarium, January 2016)
Surprisier (L'Extraordinarium, February 2020)

Live albums
Whatever the Weather – Concert Électrique (Trema, 2003)
Whatever the Weather – Concert Acoustique (Trema, 2003)
Monsters in Live (2007)

DVDs
Whatever the Weather (2003) – recorded 30 May 2003 at 'La Laiterie' in Strasbourg
Monsters in Live (2007) – recorded 28 October 2006 at Le Zénith in Paris with the Synfonietta de Belfort orchestra

Other
Yoghurt session (1997) – extremely rare vinyl
Soon, on your radio (1998) – a CD featuring Dionysos alongside Mary's Child and Despondents
Old School Recordings (Trema, 15 May 2001) – a collection of rare recordings
Eats Music (Barclay, 12 October 2009) – another collection of rare recordings, demos and alternative or live versions of previous released tracks

References

External links

 Official website (in French) – discography, media, and information
 Official MySpace
 RFI's review of Monsters in Love

French indie rock groups
Musical groups established in 1993
French alternative rock groups
Musical groups from Auvergne-Rhône-Alpes
French art rock groups